Lamarque is a city in the Avellaneda Department of Río Negro Province, Argentina. According to the 2010 census by INDEC, the urban area had a population of 7,686.

Lamarque is the birthplace of writer Rodolfo Walsh.

References 

Populated places in Río Negro Province
Populated places established in 1900